Venezuela competed at the 2022 World Athletics Championships in Eugene, Oregon from 15 to 24 July 2022. Venezuela had entered 4 athletes. Yulimar Rojas won the women's triple jump final to seal a third straight world triple jump crown, after Doha 2019 and London 2017, which made her the first three-time world champion in the discipline at the World Athletics Championships.

Medalists

Results

Women

Track and road events

Field events

References

Venezuela
World Championships in Athletics
2022